Ustrovka is a village in Sandovsky District of Tver Oblast, Russia.

References

Rural localities in Sandovsky District
Vesyegonsky Uyezd